Basal cell adhesion molecule, also known as Lutheran antigen, is a plasma membrane glycoprotein that in humans is encoded by the BCAM gene. BCAM has also recently been designated CD239 (cluster of differentiation 239).

Function 

Lutheran blood group glycoprotein is a member of the immunoglobulin superfamily and a receptor for the extracellular matrix protein, laminin. The protein contains five, N-terminus, extracellular immunoglobulin domains, a single transmembrane domain, and a short, C-terminal cytoplasmic tail. This protein may play a role in epithelial cell cancer and in vaso-occlusion of red blood cells in sickle cell disease. Two transcript variants encoding different isoforms have been found for this gene.

Interactions 

BCAM has been shown to interact with Laminin, alpha 5.

References

Further reading

External links
 
 

Clusters of differentiation
Immunoglobulin superfamily
Glycoproteins